Enric Franquesa Dolz (born 26 February 1997) is a Spanish professional footballer who plays as a left back for CD Leganés, on loan from Levante UD.

Club career
Born in Sant Cugat del Vallès, Barcelona, Catalonia, Franquesa joined FC Barcelona's La Masia in 2006 from hometown side Club Junior 1917. He made his senior debut with the reserves on 27 March 2016, coming on as a late substitute for goalscorer Alberto Perea in a 2–0 Segunda División B away defeat of CD Llosetense.

On 21 July 2016, Franquesa was loaned to CE Sabadell FC in the third division, for one year. The following 19 January, after appearing sparingly, he moved to fellow league team CF Gavà also in a temporary deal.

In June 2017, Franquesa agreed to a contract with Villarreal CF, being initially assigned to the B-team still in division three. On 25 April 2019, he signed a contract extension until 2022.

On 25 July 2019, Franquesa was loaned to Segunda División newcomers CD Mirandés, for one year. He made his professional debut on 17 August, starting in a 2–2 away draw against Rayo Vallecano.

On 27 August 2020, Franquesa agreed to a one-year loan deal with second division side Girona FC. On 2 July of the following year, he agreed to a four-year deal with La Liga side Levante UD.

Franquesa made his top tier debut on 22 August 2021, playing the last four minutes in a 3–3 home draw against Real Madrid. On 19 January 2023, he was loaned to CD Leganés until June.

Career statistics

Club

References

External links

1997 births
Living people
People from Sant Cugat del Vallès
Sportspeople from the Province of Barcelona
Footballers from Catalonia
Spanish footballers
Association football defenders
La Liga players
Segunda División players
Segunda División B players
FC Barcelona Atlètic players
CE Sabadell FC footballers
CF Gavà players
Villarreal CF B players
CD Mirandés footballers
Girona FC players
Levante UD footballers
CD Leganés players